11th Infantry Brigade may refer to:

 11th Infantry Brigade (Australia)
 11th Infantry Brigade (United Kingdom)
 11th Infantry Brigade (United States)